USS SC-142, sometimes styled as either Submarine Chaser No. 142 or S.C.-142, was an  built for the United States Navy during World War I. Upon completion, she was transferred to the French Navy

SC-142 was built at Rocky River Dry Dock Co. in Rocky River, Ohio, probably in 1917.

On 15 April 1918 SC-142 left Bermuda in a convoy with 29 other submarine chasers, four U.S. Navy tugs, two French tugs and destroyer tender . Cruiser  and armed yacht  performed escort duty for the convoy. On 25 April, SC-142 was taken under tow for a time by Bridgeport, and two days later, the convoy reached Ponta Delgada, Azores.

The ultimate fate of SC-142 is unknown.

Notes

References

External links 
 

SC-1-class submarine chasers
World War I patrol vessels of France
Ships built in Ohio
World War I patrol vessels of the United States
1917 ships